Love, Chunibyo & Other Delusions, known in Japan as Chūnibyō demo Koi ga Shitai, is an anime television series based on Torako's light novel and produced by Kyoto Animation. The series follows a high school boy named Yūta Togashi, who tries to discard his embarrassing past grandiose delusions, until he meets a girl named Rikka Takanashi, who exhibits her own signs of chūnibyō syndrome. As their relationship progresses, they form a club called the Far East Magical Napping Society Summer Thereof, alongside Shinka Nibutani, Kumin Tsuyuri, and Sanae Dekomori, who each have their own unique delusional behaviors.

The series aired in Japan between October 4 and December 19, 2012. Starting before the series' airing, a series of six original net animation shorts titled Love, Chunibyo & Other Delusions Lite were streamed weekly on YouTube between September 27 and November 1, 2012. The series was released on six Blu-ray and DVD compilation volumes between December 19, 2012 and May 15, 2013, by Pony Canyon. The volumes contained bonus shorts titled . A seventh volume, containing an original video animation episode and the Lite shorts, was released on June 19, 2013. The series is licensed in North America by Sentai Filmworks and was streamed on The Anime Network.

The opening theme is "Sparkling Daydream" by Zaq, and the ending theme is "Inside Identity" by Black Raison d'être (Maaya Uchida, Chinatsu Akasaki, Azumi Asakura and Sumire Uesaka). The single for "Sparkling Daydream" was released on October 24, 2012 and the single for "Inside Identity" on November 21, 2012.

An animated film serving as a retelling of the series was released on September 14, 2013. A second series, Love, Chunibyo & Other Delusions -Heart Throb- (Chūnibyō demo Koi ga Shitai: Ren) aired on television from January 8, 2014, to March 26, 2014, and was simulcast by Crunchyroll. The first episode of a second set of Lite episodes was released on December 26, 2013 and a second series of shorts called Heated Table Series: Kotatsu accompanied each BD/DVD release, starting on March 19, 2014. The opening theme is "Voice" by Zaq and the ending theme is "Van!shment Th!s World" by Black Raison d'être. Sentai Filmworks licensed the second season and released it in August 2015.

Episode list

Love, Chunibyo & Other Delusions (2012)

Lite episodes

Depth of Field: Ai to Nikushimi Gekijō

Films

Love, Chunibyo & Other Delusions -Heart Throb- (2014)

Ren Lite episodes

Heated Table Series: Kotatsu episodes

References

Love, Chunibyo and Other Delusions